There's a Whole Lalo Schifrin Goin' On is an album by Argentine composer, pianist and conductor Lalo Schifrin recorded in 1968 and released on the Dot label.

The title was devised by Gary Owens.

Reception
Allmusic called the album "ahead of its time in terms of instrumentation, but (...) a product of its time in that established ways of doing things were being challenged", and noted that listeners whose prior experience of Schifrin's work was limited to the Mission Impossible theme would "be drawn in further by the eccentric genius displayed here".

Track listing
All compositions by Lalo Schifrin
 "Secret Code Synthesizer" - 2:27 
 "Dissolving" - 2:30 
 "Machinations" - 2:40 
 "Bride of the Wind" - 2:30 
 "Life Insurance" - 2:06 
 "How to Open at Will the Most Beautiful Window" - 2:58 
 "Vaccinated Mushrooms" - 2:40 
 "Two Petals, a Flower and a Young Girl" - 2:09 
 "Wheat Germ Landscapes" - 2:26 
 "Gentle Earthquake" - 3:29 
 "Hawks vs. Doves" - 2:24 
Recorded in Los Angeles, California on March 18, 19 & 20, 1968

Personnel
Lalo Schifrin - piano, synthesizer, arranger, conductor
Tony Terran, John Audino - trumpet
Lloyd Ulyate, Barrett O'Hara - trombone
John Johnson - tuba
Vincent DeRosa - horn
Bud Shank, Ronnie Lang, Sam Most - reeds
Arnold Kobentz - oboe, English horn
Ralph Grierson, Artie Kane, Roger Kellaway, Mike Lang - keyboards
Paul Beaver - keyboards, synthesizer, stereo harp
Carl Fortina - accordion
Howard Roberts, Dennis Budimer, Bill Pitman, Louis Morell - guitar
James Bond, Ray Brown - bass
Carol Kaye, Max Bennett - electric bass
Shelly Manne - drums, percussion
Earl Palmer, Ken Watson, Joe Porcaro, Emil Richards - percussion
Milt Holland - tabla
Bonnie Douglas, Sam Freed, Anatol Kaminsky, Nathan Kaproff, George Kast, Marvin Limonick, Erno Neufeld, Paul Shure - violin
Myra Kestenbaum, Allan Harshman, Robert Ostrowsky, Virginia Majewski - viola
Raphael Kramer, Edgar Lustgarten, Eleanor Slatkin - cello
Catherine Gotthoffer - harp
Robert Helfer - orchestra manager

References

Lalo Schifrin albums
1968 albums
Albums arranged by Lalo Schifrin
Dot Records albums
Instrumental albums